Leptospermum morrisonii is a shrub or small tree that is endemic to New South Wales. It has strongly aromatic, elliptical to lance-shaped or curved leaves, white or greenish white flowers and fruit that remain on the plant. It occurs in the south-east of the state.

Description
The bark on older stems is corrugated, the younger stems softly-hairy with a distinct flange. There are broad, reddish brown bracts and bracteoles at the base of the flower bud but most are shed before the flower opens. Flowering mainly occurs from late December to January and the fruit is a capsule usually  in diameter.

Taxonomy and naming
Leptospermum morrisonii was first formally described in 1989 by Joy Thompson in the journal Telopea, based on plant material collected by Hugo Salasoo, near Mount Dhruwalgha, south-east of Robertson. The specific epithet (morrisonii) honours David Morrison for his genecological work.

Distribution and habitat
This tea-tree grows in woodland and shrubland in rocky paces and on rocky creek banks from the southern Blue Mountains to the Corang River further south.

References

morrisonii
Myrtales of Australia
Flora of New South Wales
Plants described in 1989
Taxa named by Joy Thompson